Acarophenacidae is a family of mites in the order Trombidiformes that are egg parasitoids and ectoparasites of beetles or thrips. It contains eight genera and around 40 species.

Morphology 
Acarophenacidae are <200 μm in length and elongate to oval in shape. Distinguishing features are the gnathosoma (mouthparts) partially/completely fused into the propodosoma, indistinct palps and the first leg pair being thickest.

Life cycle 
Acarophenacidae have a reduced life cycle, in which the larvae complete their development within their mother; the entire life cycle can take only 4–5 days.

 A mated female rides on an adult insect to disperse to new areas. In genus Adactylidium, she also feeds on the insect's body fluids.
 When the insect begins laying eggs, the female drops off to feed on the eggs. Her abdomen swells up greatly (physogastrism).
 Offspring develop within the mother.
 Normally one male develops per mother. He develops slightly more quickly than his sisters and inseminates them while still inside the mother's body.
 Females leave the mother's body and seek hosts, beginning the cycle again.

Biological control 
Some Acarophenacidae have been suggested as biological control agents as they reduce populations of their hosts. These include Acarophenax mahunkai for the lesser mealworm (Alphitobius diaperinus), and Acarophenax lacunatus for red flour beetle (Tribolium castaneum) and lined flat bark beetle (Cryptolestes ferrugineus).

References

External links

Trombidiformes
Acari families